Holton is an unincorporated community in Tangipahoa Parish, Louisiana, United States. The community is located   E of Amite City, Louisiana.

References

Unincorporated communities in Tangipahoa Parish, Louisiana
Unincorporated communities in Louisiana